Chauncey Thomas Jr. (April 27, 1850 – May 12, 1919) was a rear admiral of the United States Navy. The son of Chauncey Thomas, a farmer and entrepreneur, who built four bridges across the Delaware River at Shohola Glen, Pennsylvania, Thomas Jr., graduated from the United States Naval Academy third in the class of 1871. He was the Commander of the United States Pacific Fleet when he retired in 1912. He died at the age of 69 in Pacific Grove, California.

The Albatross expedition
Chauncey Thomas, as captain, commanded the US Fish Commission steamer,  during a scientific expedition in the Hawaiian Islands and southern Pacific in 1902.  Orders issued at the onset of the expedition made it unclear where ultimate authority in the expedition lay, with the ship's captain, or the scientist-in-charge, Charles Henry Gilbert (1859–1929).  Before leaving port, Thomas requested clarification, which he received, confirming the norm: that the ship's captain always had ultimate authority regarding the safety of the crew and the ship.  The expedition proceeded, but was marred by a barrage of complaints that pitted the scientific crew against the ship's crew, and was characterized by lengthy letters.

Career
Thomas held a variety of commands in the United States Navy.  For 27 months, he was commander of the gunboat , which cruised in the eastern Pacific along the coasts of North and South America Alaskan ports in the summer of 1903 and the coast of Central America the following fall and winter.

Rear Admiral
As commander of the Second Squadron of the Pacific Fleet, he relieved Rear Admiral Edward B. Barry as Commander in Chief of the Pacific Fleet in January 1911 upon orders of the Naval Department.  Admiral Barry was forced to resign after an alleged affair with a cabin boy.

Family and residence
In 1895, Chauncey Thomas purchased the property known as Hitching Post Hill, an early 19th-century horse farm in Prince George's County, Maryland.

Namesake
Camp Thomas, formed in 1910 as a base for the 4th Marine Regiment, was named for him.  The Regiment was deployed there against the possibility of the disorder in Mexico spreading to Southern California.  Camp Thomas disbanded in June, 1911.

References

 

1919 deaths
1850 births
People from Sullivan County, New York
United States Naval Academy alumni
United States Navy admirals